Ron Brett (4 September 1937 – 30 August 1962) was an English professional footballer who played as a forward.

Career
Brett started his career at Crystal Palace as a junior, signing professional terms in September 1954. He made his debut on 3 September 1955 in an away 1–1 draw against Millwall and went on to make 36 appearances for Palace, scoring 12 twelve goals. In June 1959, he moved to West Ham United, in a deal which saw Malcolm Pyke move the other way. Brett made 13 appearances in all competitions for West Ham between September 1959 and March 1962 before returning to Crystal Palace as part of the deal which saw Johnny Byrne move to "The Hammers". Five months after returning to Palace, Brett was killed when his car hit a lorry in Clerkenwell, London. The last match he played, just days before his death, was a reserve game between his two clubs, Crystal Palace and West Ham. At the time of his death, he had scored 13 goals in all competitions for Crystal Palace.

References

External links

1937 births
English footballers
Association football forwards
Crystal Palace F.C. players
West Ham United F.C. players
English Football League players
Road incident deaths in London
People from Stanford-le-Hope
1962 deaths